This list is of Major Sites Protected for their Historical and Cultural Value at the National Level in the Province of Shaanxi, People's Republic of China.

 

  
   
  
 
 

 

 

 
 
  
 

 

  

 

 

 

|}

See also
 Principles for the Conservation of Heritage Sites in China

References

 
Shaanxi